Malacca Chief Minister Gallery is a gallery which displays gifts, souvenirs, personal collections and biographies of the State's Chief Ministers in Bukit Peringgit. Its building used to be the official residence for the Chief Ministers from 1972 until 2006, when the new one at the Seri Negeri complex in Ayer Keroh was completed.

See also
 List of tourist attractions in Malacca

References

2006 establishments in Malaysia
Art museums and galleries in Melaka
Central Melaka District